Ruben Karel Sanadi (born on 8 January 1987 in Biak, Indonesia) is an Indonesian professional footballer who plays as a left back for Liga 1 club Bhayangkara.

Career statistics

International

Honours

Club
Persipura Jayapura
 Indonesia Super League: 2013
 Indonesia Soccer Championship A: 2016

Individual
 Liga 1 Team of the Season: 2019

References

External links
 Ruben Sanadi at Liga Indonesia
 

1988 births
Living people
People from Biak
Indonesian footballers
Papuan sportspeople
Indonesian Premier Division players
Liga 1 (Indonesia) players
Persikota Tangerang players
Persipasi Bekasi players
PSMS Medan players
Pelita Jaya FC players
Persipura Jayapura players
Persebaya Surabaya players
Bhayangkara F.C. players
Indonesia youth international footballers
Indonesia international footballers
Sportspeople from Papua
Association football defenders